Tien Ah-mei (born 20 June 1946) is a Taiwanese sprinter. She competed in the women's 200 metres at the 1968 Summer Olympics.

References

External links
 

1946 births
Living people
Athletes (track and field) at the 1968 Summer Olympics
Taiwanese female sprinters
Taiwanese pentathletes
Olympic athletes of Taiwan
Place of birth missing (living people)
Asian Games medalists in athletics (track and field)
Asian Games silver medalists for Chinese Taipei
Athletes (track and field) at the 1966 Asian Games
Medalists at the 1966 Asian Games
Olympic female sprinters